GSG may refer to:

Businesses
 German Sport Guns GmbH, a German firearms manufacturer

Government
 Government Statistician Group, a community of government statisticians in the UK
 GSG 9, a German counter-terrorism and special operations unit

Other organizations
 Global Scenario Group, an environmental research organization
 Global Strategy Group, an American public affairs and research firm
 Grampian Speleological Group, a caving organisation, based in Scotland
 Great Southern Grammar, a school in rural Western Australia
 Grove Street Games, a video game developer

Other uses
 German Sign Language (ISO 639-3 language code)
 The Good Schools Guide, a British guide to schools
 Grand strategy game, a genre of board games and video games